Jerry Wayne Hairston Sr. (born February 16, 1952) is a former left fielder in Major League Baseball, and the father of  Jerry Hairston Jr. and Scott Hairston. During his 14-year career, Hairston specialized as a pinch hitter. He is also the father of Justin Hairston, Stacey Hairston, and Anna Hairston.

Career
Hairston played 14 seasons in the majors, mostly with the Chicago White Sox and part of one season with the Pittsburgh Pirates. He also played three years (from 1978 to 1980) with Durango of the Mexican League. While playing in Mexico, Hairston won a batting title and twice represented Mexican League teams at the Caribbean Series. He met his wife, Esperanza Arellano, in Hermosillo, Mexico and the couple held a wedding ceremony at Héctor Espino Stadium.

On April 15, Hairston broke a perfect game bid by Milt Wilcox of the Detroit Tigers, singling with two out in the ninth inning.

Hairston was raised a Jehovah's Witnesses by his father, and credits his faith for getting him through four seasons in Mexico.

He is the son of yet another former major leaguer, Sam, and the brother of another, Johnny.

The Hairston family is one of only three families (along with the Boone family and the Bell family) to have had three generations of major league players.

See also
List of second-generation Major League Baseball players

References

External links

1952 births
Living people
African-American baseball players
Alacranes de Durango players
Alacranes de Campeche players
American expatriate baseball players in Mexico
American Jehovah's Witnesses
Appleton Foxes players
Baseball players from Birmingham, Alabama
Chicago White Sox players
Denver Bears players
Diablos Rojos del México players
Gulf Coast White Sox players
Iowa Oaks players
Knoxville Sox players
Major League Baseball left fielders
Mexican League baseball managers
Minor league baseball managers
Pittsburgh Pirates players
21st-century African-American people
20th-century African-American sportspeople